(Northern Bavarian: Wåuṉsieḏl or Wousigl) is the seat of the Upper Franconian district of  in northeast Bavaria, Germany.  The town is the birthplace of poet Jean Paul. It also became known for its annual  Festival and the Rudolf Hess Memorial March held there by Neo-Nazis until 2005.

Geography 

History 

In 1285, Burgrave Friedrich III of Nuremberg received the fiefdom of the town from King Rudolph I of Habsburg. In 1326,  was given town rights by Burgrave Friedrich IV and this was confirmed in 1328 by Emperor Louis the Bavarian.

In the Middle Ages,  was a centre of tin mining and achieved great economic importance through the manufacture of tin plate. In 1613, it became capital of the  — an area comparable in size to the modern district .

 was a part of the  Principality of Bayreuth  until 1791/92 when the last margrave, Karl Alexander, abdicated and the region was placed under Prussian administration. It was occupied for four years by Napoleon's troops and, in 1810, became part of the Kingdom of Bavaria.

Fires in 1476, 1547, 1607, 1636, 1644, 1646, 1657 and 1731 destroyed various parts of the town.

Birthplace of the nationalist student  (October 5, 1795) who later went on to assassinate , a famous conservative German playwright. Kotzebue's death was a direct result of his published ridicule of the student associations in general, however focusing harshest comments on the newly formed , student organizations that supported free institutions, a national German state, uncensored press. In addition, the affluent writer was appointed as Russia's "ambassador" (by Russia) making his death a certainty. In his role as ambassador, Kotzebue was accused as being a "spy" while his role as editor of a literature review magazine brought him accusation of outright plagiarism. In 1817 at the Wartburg Castle, during a gathering of students, the burning of his published works with those of other "enemies" bought him to the attention of the young Karl Sand. In retrospect, a case for post traumatic stress syndrome, as a complicating factor, could probably be made as Karl Sand witnessed, helplessly, the drowning of his good friend just months prior to the murder.

Wunsiedel and Rudolf Hess 

In the late 1980s, the cemetery of  became rather infamous after Adolf Hitler's deputy Rudolf Hess, who had died in a Berlin prison on 17 August 1987, was buried there. In the years that followed, neo-nazi groups organized memorial marches on each 17 August. The number of participants rose from 120 in 1988 to more than 1,100 in 1990. The gatherings faced protests from anti-fascist groups. Neo-Nazi marches were banned in 1991.

Under the impression that the situation had "cooled down", the Bavarian Administrative Court permitted the gatherings again in 2001. The anti-fascist initiative "" (' is colourful, not brown') organised a counter-demonstration with about 800 participants, decorating the city with rainbow flags and spraying the marchers with confetti.

In 2005, the memorial march was banned for the first time on the basis of article 130 of the German criminal code, which outlaws incitement of the people. A complaint against the ban was rejected by the Federal Constitutional Court.

The town decided to have the Hess grave removed in 2011. The family of Rudolf Hess arranged with the cemetery to have Hess’s remains exhumed, cremated and scattered at sea to deter any further pilgrimages to his grave. The gravestone with the words "" ('I have dared') was removed and destroyed. Smaller neo-Nazi marches continued afterward, leading the human-rights group  to organise a charity drive whereby a certain sum of money would be donated to the organisation , which helps neo-Nazis leave the movement, for each meter marched.

Main sights 

 Luisenburg Rock Labyrinth, municipal landscape garden and national geotope
  Municipal Park
 The now empty grave of Rudolf Hess in the cemetery, major Nazi war criminal, sentenced in the Nuremberg
 In the same cemetery are the individual and multiple graves of 30 Jewish concentration camp victims, who lost their lives during a death march in the last days of the Second World War in 1945
 Wunsiedel Birds of Prey Park and falconry at the Katharinenberg Municipal Park
  Deer Park
 Historic town walk through the classicist old town
 Jean-Paul circular walk in North 
 The  and St. Joseph's Chapel
 Fichtelgebirge Museum, the largest Bavarian regional museum with an extensive stone and mineral collection
 German Natural Stone Archive, the largest collection of its kind in the world with 5,500 templates of natural stones from across the world
 St. Veit's Parish Church
 St. Maria 
 Parish Church of the Twelve Apostles
 Peace Church of the Holy Trinity
 The Town Hall of 1835/1837
 The  Gate, the only surviving gate of the old town defences (erected in 1471)
 Jean Paul's birthplace (a former schoolhouse) with a bust of Jean Paul by 
 Bernstein Castle

Government

Town council 

 is governed by a mayor and town council with 24 seats. Both are elected every four years. In the council, the CSU currently holds 13 seats, the SPD holds 7 seats, and the Greens 1 seat. The remaining 3 seats went to a free voters' association. Recent results are:

Incorporated villages 
The town's borough includes the following villages (year of incorporation in brackets):

.

Economy 
In addition several car dealerships have their headquarters in the town, of which  has the most employees. One popular export product is the herb-flavoured spirit . Unemployment at 7.6% is well above the Bavarian average. Wunsiedel Marble is quarried locally.

Public institutions

State institutions 
The state institutions in Wunsiedel are the district administrative office, the finance office, the survey office, the magistrate's court, the office of agriculture and forests, the health insurance office, the education office and a police station.

Educational establishments 
 Town singing and music school
 Jean Paul School (primary and secondary modern school)
  Grammar School
  Middle School
 State School of Economics
 State Technical College for Stonemasonry and German Natural Stone Archive
 European Training Centre for Masonry and Stone Sculpture
  State Vocational College
 State Hunting School of the Bavarian Hunting Conservation and Hunters' Association (BJV)
 Town Archive
 Town Library
 Hous of the  Club
  District Adult Education Centre

Leisure and sports facilities 
In addition to the  Hall and  Stadium there is the town open-air swimming pool and sauna and the indoor pool. On the  there is a youth hostel and a youth centre, recently renovated by the town. As well as the sports facilities belonging to clubs there are also various children's play parks. On 21 December 2009 the largest climbing wall in North Bavaria was opened in the premises of the old sugar factory.

International relations

Wunsiedel is twinned with:
 Torbalı, Turkey, since 1980
 Mende, France, since 1980
 Schwarzenberg, Germany, since 1990
 Volterra, Italy, since 2006
 Ostrov, Czech Republic, since 2009

Culture 
Regular events held in Wunsiedel include:

 Luisenburg Festival from June to August on the oldest open-air and natural stage in Germany
 Well festival on Saturday before the 24 June (St. John's)
 Funfair on the municipal festival square from Friday to Tuesday in the first week of July
 Wunsiedel Culture Evening on the second Saturday in May
 Museum Festival in the Fichtelgebirge Museum on the second Sunday in September
 Wunsiedel Pub Night beginning of November
 Wunsiedel Wood Days (biannual) in September 2011
 Toyota Meet on the Luisenburg car park. Every first weekend in September

Transport 
The B 303 federal road runs two kilometres to the south of Wunsiedel, which joins the A 9 motorway from Munich to Berlin near Bad Berneck (the B 303 is the east-west link between the Czech Republic and the A 9). The new A 93 from Hof to Regensburg runs in a north-south direction, with exits at the Wunsiedel junction or state road S 2177 Hof–Wunsiedel

The nearest train station, is located in the nearby village of Holenbrunn (about three kilometres away). There used to be branch lines from Holenbrunn via Wunsiedel and Tröstau to Leupoldsdorf and from Holenbrunn to Selb. These lines have now been closed and the trackbeds used as cycle paths in places.

Bus connections go from Wunsiedel Bus Station in all directions.

There is a regional airport at Hof-Plauen (ca.  from Wunsiedel).

Notable residents 

 Eugen Johann Christoph Esper (1742-1810), entomologist, botanist and pathologist
 Jean Paul (1763–1825), author
 Karl Ludwig Sand (1795-1820), Burschenschafter, murderer of August von Kotzebue 
 Heinrich Hohenner (1874-1966), professor of geodesy 
 Wilhelm Wirth (1876-1952), psychologist
 Hannsheinz Bauer (1909–2005), politician (SPD), one of the "fathers" of the Basic Law, 
  (1923-2003), teacher and expert for natural stone, founder of the Naturstein Archive of the State Technical College for Stone Processing in Wunsiedel
 Siegfried Roch (born 1959), handball national goalkeeper, silver medal winner
 Wolfgang Haffner (born 1965), jazz drummer
 Markus Dorsch (born 1982), comedian

References

Sources 
 Die Kunstdenkmäler von Oberfranken, Bd. 1: Landkreis Wunsiedel und Stadtkreis Marktredwitz. 1954.

External links 

 Town of Wunsiedel 
 District of Wunsiedel 
 Information at Bayern-Fichtelgebirge 
 

 
Wunsiedel (district)
Fichtel Mountains